Yamamotoyama is a Japanese tea and seaweed manufacturer which traces its company's roots to 1690, claiming to be the oldest tea company in the world. The company began as a tea shop in Nihonbashi, and pioneered the production of gyokuro green tea in 1835. Yamamotoyama expanded to the U.S. in 1975.

References

Tea brands in Japan
Tea companies of Japan